A leap year starting on Sunday is any year with 366 days (i.e. it includes 29 February) that begins on Sunday, 1 January, and ends on Monday, 31 December. Its dominical letters hence are AG. The most recent year of such kind was 2012 and the next one will be 2040 in the Gregorian calendar or, likewise, 1996 and 2024 in the obsolete Julian calendar.

This is the only leap year with three occurrences of Friday the 13th: those three in this leap year occur three months (13 weeks) apart: in January, April, and July. Common years starting on Thursday share this characteristic, in the months of February, March, and November.

In this leap year, Martin Luther King Jr. Day is on January 16; Valentine's Day is on a Tuesday; Presidents' Day is on February 20; the leap day is on a Wednesday; Saint Patrick's Day is on a Saturday; Memorial Day is on May 28; Juneteenth is on a Tuesday; U.S. Independence Day is on a Wednesday; Labor Day is on September 3; Columbus Day is on its earliest possible date, October 8; Election Day in the USA is on November 6th; Halloween is on a Wednesday; Veterans Day is on a Sunday; Thanksgiving is on its earliest possible date, November 22; and Christmas is on a Tuesday.

In this type of year, all dates (except 29 February) fall on their respective weekdays 58 times in the 400 year Gregorian calendar cycle. Leap years starting on Friday share this characteristic. Additionally, these types of years are the only ones which contain 54 different calendar weeks (2 partial, 52 in full) in areas of the world where Monday is considered the first day of the week.

Calendars

Applicable years

Gregorian Calendar
Leap years that begin on Sunday, along with those that start on Friday, occur most frequently: 15 out of the 97 (≈ 15.46%) total leap years in a 400-year cycle of the Gregorian calendar. Thus, the overall occurrence is 3.75% (15 out of 400).

400 year cycle

century 1: 12, 40, 68, 96

century 2: 108, 136, 164, 192

century 3: 204, 232, 260, 288

century 4: 328, 356, 384

Julian Calendar
Like all leap year types, the one starting with 1 January on a Sunday occurs exactly once in a 28-year cycle in the Julian calendar, i.e., in 3.57% of years. As the Julian calendar repeats after 28 years, it will also repeat after 700 years, i.e., 25 cycles. The formula gives the year's position in the cycle ((year + 8) mod 28) + 1).

References

Gregorian calendar
Julian calendar
Sunday